Āmouli is a village on the southeast coast of Tutuila Island, American Samoa at the narrowest point of the island. It is located to the west of 'Au'asi, immediately to the south of 'Aoa on the north coast. It was home to 920 residents at the 2010 U.S. Census, all of which were Pacific Islanders by race. It is located in Sa'Ole County.

A larger shipwreck is located right beside the road in Āmouli. Locals say the vessel ran aground with a full load of fish, and when it overturned, it spilled its cargo within reach of villagers to gather it.

Dr. Charles Fletcher of the University of Hawaiʻi at Mānoa has conducted a sea level study of Āmouli village. He was the keynote speaker at American Samoa's first climate change summit in 2011, where he revealed that land in the village near the sea could be covered by water within ten years.

Demographics

References

Villages in American Samoa